The Ministry of Justice (MOJ) is a ministerial level governmental body of the Republic of China (Taiwan), responsible for carrying out various judicial functions.

History

Taiwan's first Justice Ministry was created in 1895 under Japan's Ministry of Justice, founded in 1871 during the Meiji era, when Taiwan was under colonial rule.

The Ministry of Justice was established in 1912 upon the establishment of the Republic of China, with the first Minister of Justice being Mao Zhuquan.  After China was unified under the Nationalist government, the Judicial Yuan was inaugurated and the ministry was renamed the Ministry of Judicial Administration and placed under administration of the Judicial Yuan. In 1943, the ministry was shifted from the Judicial Yuan to the Executive Yuan. After the Chinese Civil War in 1949, the administration was shifted to Taipei. On 1 July 1980, the ministry was renamed again as the Ministry of Justice.

Organizational structure
The Ministry of Justice has the following branches:

Departments
 Department of Legal System
 Department of Legal Affairs
 Department of Prosecutorial Affairs
 Department of International and Cross-Strait Legal Affairs
 Department of Prevention, Rehabilitation and Protection
 Department of Government Employee Ethics
 Department of Personnel
 Department of Accounting
 Department of Statistics
 Department of Information Management
 Secretariat

Affiliated agencies 

 Investigation Bureau
 Administrative Enforcement Agency 
 Agency Against Corruption
 Agency of Corrections
 Prosecutors Office
 Academy for the Judiciary
 Institute of Forensic Medicine

Functions
 Legal Affairs
 Procuratorial Administration
 Correctional Operations
 Judicial Protection
 Operations on Government Employee Ethics
 Information Management
 Investigation Work
 Cultivation of Personnel

List of Ministers 
Political parties:

Access
The MOJ building is within walking distance just north of the Xiaonanmen Station of the Taipei Metro on the Green Line.

See also 
 Justice ministry
 Constitution of the Republic of China
 Six Codes
 Law of Taiwan
 Law schools in Taiwan
 Judicial Yuan
 Politics of the Republic of China
 Supreme Court of the Republic of China
 Supreme Prosecutors Office
 Taiwan High Prosecutors Office
 District Courts (Taiwan)

Notes

References

External links 

Taiwan Law Resources
The Judicial Yuan
The Ministry of Justice
Taipei District Prosecutors Office
Legislative Yuan
Executive Yuan

Justice
Taiwan
Taiwan